Taylor Ayn Mikesell (born September 30, 1999) is an American college basketball player for the Ohio State Buckeyes of the Big Ten Conference. She previously played for the Maryland Terrapins and the Oregon Ducks.

High school career
Mikesell played for Jackson High School in Massillon, Ohio. As a senior, she scored 60 points, shooting 14-of-17 from three-point range, against Austintown Fitch High School. During the game, Mikesell became the all-time leading scorer in Stark County, Ohio and set the state record for three-pointers in a game. She averaged 30.7 points, 6.5 rebounds and 3.7 steals per game, leading her team to the Division I state quarterfinals. Mikesell was named Ohio High School Basketball Coaches Association Division I Player of the Year. Rated a five-star recruit by ESPN, she committed to playing college basketball for Maryland over offers from Florida State and Stanford.

College career
As a freshman at Maryland, Mikesell averaged 13.4 points and 3.5 rebounds per game, and was named Big Ten Freshman of the Year. She earned first-team All-Big Ten recognition from the media and was a second-team selection by the media. Mikesell broke the school single-season record for three-pointers by a women's or men's player. As a sophomore, she averaged 11.2 points per game and earned All-Big Ten honorable mention, before transferring to Oregon, where she averaged 9.3 points as a junior. For her senior season, Mikesell transferred to Ohio State. On January 20, 2022, she scored a career-high 33 points and shot 11-of-13 from the field in a 95–89 win over Maryland. Mikesell averaged 18.6 points per game as a senior, earning first-team All-Big Ten honors. She led the Big Ten and ranked second in the NCAA Division I in three-point percentage (47.5). She opted to return for a fifth season of eligibility.

National team career
Mikesell played for the United States at the 2016 FIBA Under-17 World Championship for Women in Spain. She averaged five points per game and helped her team win a bronze medal. Mikesell was selected to represent the United States at the 2019 Pan American Games in Peru. She averaged five points per game as her team won the silver medal.

See also 
 List of NCAA Division I women's basketball career 3-point scoring leaders

References

External links
Maryland Terrapins bio
Ohio State Buckeyes bio
Oregon Ducks bio

Living people
1999 births
American women's basketball players
Basketball players from Ohio
Sportspeople from Massillon, Ohio
Ohio State Buckeyes women's basketball players
Maryland Terrapins women's basketball players
Oregon Ducks women's basketball players
Guards (basketball)